Pantanaw Township is a township of Maubin District in the Ayeyarwady Region of Myanmar. It covers an Area: 1,331 km² and Density: 198.8/km². As of 2014, the city population is over two million people.

References

Townships of Ayeyarwady Region